John Thadeuz Halama (born February 22, 1972) is a former Major League Baseball pitcher. During his major league career, Halama played with the Houston Astros, Seattle Mariners (–), Oakland Athletics, Tampa Bay Devil Rays, Boston Red Sox, Washington Nationals (2005), and Baltimore Orioles. He bats and throws left-handed.

Career

Houston Astros
Halama made his debut with the Houston Astros in 1998. Prior to that he had attended St. Francis College and Pitched for the Terriers from 1991 to 1994. Halama also attended and graduated from Bishop Ford Central Catholic High School in Brooklyn, New York in 1990.

Seattle Mariners
In midseason 1998, Halama was sent to Seattle along with Freddy García and Carlos Guillén in the same trade that brought Randy Johnson to Houston. In , Halama threw the first nine-inning perfect game in the history of the Pacific Coast League.

Oakland Athletics
In 2003, Halama went 3–5 in 35 games for the A's.

Tampa Bay Devil Rays
In 2004, Halama went 7–6 with a 4.70 ERA in 34 appearances, including 14 starts for the Devil Rays.

Boston Red Sox
Halama was signed by Boston as a free agent on December 17, 2004. After appearing in 30 games, Halama was released by the Red Sox on July 17, 2005.

Washington Nationals
Halama was signed by the Nationals on August 5, 2005, and made ten appearances for them, including three starts, before his release on October 2.

Baltimore Orioles
In 2006, he played his last big league season with the Baltimore Orioles, pitching to a 6.14 ERA over 17 contests.

Long Island Ducks

Cleveland Indians
On June 5, 2008, Halama signed a minor league contract with the Cleveland Indians, and was assigned to the Triple-A Buffalo Bisons. He became a free agent at the end of the season.

Southern Maryland Blue Crabs
At the end of the 2008 season, Halama signed with the Southern Maryland Blue Crabs of the Atlantic League.  There he went 8–1 with a 2.38 ERA. After his stint with Gwinnett, Halama rejoined the Blue Crabs in September 2009, and won two games, including the decisive game 5, in the first round of the Atlantic League of Professional Baseball playoffs.

Atlanta Braves
On June 13, 2009, the Atlanta Braves purchased Halama's contract from the Southern Maryland Blue Crabs. He started 13 games for the Triple-A Gwinnett Braves, and had a 4–7 record with 90 innings pitched before his release on September 18.

Milwaukee Brewers
Halama signed a minor league contract with the Milwaukee Brewers in November 2009.

On March 16, 2010, Halama was released by the Brewers.

Return to Oakland Athletics
On May 23, 2010, Halama signed a minor league contract with the Oakland Athletics. He was released by the team in September.

Lancaster Barnstormers
Halama pitched for the Lancaster Barnstormers of the Atlantic League of Professional Baseball. He was named to the 2012 Atlantic League All Star Team and was named the Starting Pitcher for the Freedom Division.

Retirement
Halama served as the pitching coach for the York Revolution, rivals of his former team, the Lancaster Barnstormers, for the 2013 season.

Major league summary

Spanning a career of seven-plus seasons in the Major Leagues, Halama compiled a 53–44 record with 469 strikeouts and a 4.60 ERA in 860.1 innings pitched.

References

External links

1972 births
Living people
Houston Astros players
Seattle Mariners players
Oakland Athletics players
Tampa Bay Devil Rays players
Boston Red Sox players
Washington Nationals players
Baltimore Orioles players
Uni-President 7-Eleven Lions players
Major League Baseball pitchers
Sportspeople from Brooklyn
Baseball players from New York City
Auburn Astros players
Quad Cities River Bandits players
Jackson Generals (Texas League) players
New Orleans Zephyrs players
Tacoma Rainiers players
Long Island Ducks players
Buffalo Bisons (minor league) players
Southern Maryland Blue Crabs players
Gwinnett Braves players
Sacramento River Cats players
Águilas Cibaeñas players
American expatriate baseball players in the Dominican Republic
St. Francis Terriers baseball players
Lancaster Barnstormers players